The Farman Highland is a relatively smooth ice-covered upland, rising to about  and forming the eastern part of the Hutton Mountains, between Wright Inlet and Keller Inlet, Lassiter Coast, Palmer Land. The feature was mapped by the United States Geological Survey from surveys and U.S. Navy aerial photographs, 1961–67, and was named by the UK Antarctic Place-Names Committee in 1991 after Joseph C. Farman, a Falkland Islands Dependencies Survey – British Antarctic Survey atmospheric physicist, 1957–90; scientific officer, Argentine Islands, 1957–59 (Base Leader, 1958–59).

References 

Plateaus of Antarctica
Landforms of Palmer Land